Oleksandr Honchar is a name of several individuals from Ukraine.

It may refer to:
 Oles Honchar, Ukrainian writer
 Oleksandr Honchar (footballer), Ukrainian football player, midfielder

See also
 Honchar